The Two Stars or The Stars or The Two Little Stars (aka Les Deux étoiles) is an Anacreontic ballet in 1 act, with choreography by Marius Petipa, and music by Cesare Pugni. Libretto by Marius Petipa, based on an ancient Greek myth.

First presented by the Imperial Ballet on January 31/February 6 (Julian/Gregorian calendar dates), 1871 at the Imperial Bolshoi Kamenny Theatre, St. Petersburg, Russia. Principal Dancers- Ekaterina Vazem (as the First Star), Alexandra Virginia (as The Second Star), and Pavel Gerdt (as Apollo)

Revivals/Restagings 

 Restaging by Marius Petipa for the Ballet of the Moscow Imperial Bolshoi Theatre as The Two Little Stars. First presented on February 25/March 3, 1878 in Moscow, Russia.
 Revival by Ivan Clustine for the Ballet of the Moscow Imperial Bolshoi Theatre as The Stars. First presented on January 14/26, 1897 in Moscow, Russia. Principal Dancers - Ekaterina Geltzer (as the First Star), Adelaide Giuri (as the Second Star), and Vasily Tikhomirov (as Mars).
 Revival by Enrico Cecchetti for the Imperial Ballet, with Riccardo Drigo making additions and revising Cesare Pugni's original score. First presented at the Imperial Mariinsky Theatre on November 1/14 1900 in St. Petersburg, Russia. Principal Dancers - Olga Preobrajenskaya (as the First Star), Nadezhda Bakerkina (as the Second Star), Nikolai Legat as Apollo, and Sergei Lukianov (as Mars)

References 

 The Two Stars was the final work of the composer Cesare Pugni before he died on January 26, 1870.
 The 1870 premiere of The Two Stars was given as a benefit performance for the Imperial Ballet's Premier danseur Pavel Gerdt.

Ballets by Marius Petipa
Ballets by Cesare Pugni
1871 ballet premieres
Ballets premiered at the Bolshoi Theatre, Saint Petersburg